Fuxin railway station is a railway station on the Jingshen Passenger Railway, in the People's Republic of China. This station was named Fuxin North railway station until 1 December 2016.

Railway stations in Fuxin